Craic on the Road: Live at Sam Maguire's was the first full-length album by Four to the Bar, released in 1994.

Track listing 

I'll Tell Me Ma (Traditional)
Waxie's Dargle/The Rare Old Mountain Dew (Traditional)
My Love's in Germany (Traditional)
I Ain't Marching Anymore (Phil Ochs)
The Hills of Connemara (Traditional)
A Taste of the Reel World (Traditional)
The Black Velvet Band/The Wild Rover/The Galway Shawl (Traditional)
The Ferryman (Pete St. John)
Mick Maguire (Traditional)
Muirsheen Durkin (Traditional)
Jenny's and Out! (Traditional)

Personnel

David Yeates: Vocals, bodhrán, flute, tin whistle
Martin Kelleher: Vocals, guitar
Patrick Clifford: Bass
Keith O'Neill: Fiddle
Seamus Casey: Djembe, congas, percussion
Tony McQuillan: Accordion

Production

Produced by Four to the Bar with Kevin Coleman
Recorded live on June 16, 1994 at Sam Maguire's Pub, Bronx NY, by Boulevard Studios, New Milford NJ
Crew chiefs: Mike Marri, Anthony Cioffi
Assistant recording engineer: Gene Porfedo
Stage engineer: Mark "Doc" Doratto
Mixed at World Studio, New York NY
Mastered at Steller Productions and Studio 900, New York NY
Mixing and mastering engineer: Tim Hatfield

References

Winick, Steve, Review of Craic on the Road, Dirty Linen Magazine, June/July 1995; Issue #58
Craic on the Road (Live at Sam Maguire's): A New Release by Four to the Bar, Irish Voice, November 2, 1994

External links
Four to the Bar official web site

Trivia

One of the album's outtakes was a spontaneous version of "Who the F*** Is Alice"
This version of "I'll Tell Me Ma" appears in iTunes' "Essential St. Patrick's Day Music" collection.
David Yeates does an impersonization of Beavis and Butthead during "Black Velvet Band."
"Mr. Maguire" appeared previously on the band's 1993 EP.
The sidewalk graffiti in the cover art was done by the band; the photographer had to stand on the tour van to get the proper angle.

1994 albums
Four to the Bar albums